Anomis flava, the cotton looper, tropical anomis or white-pupiled scallop moth, is a moth of the family Erebidae. The species was first described by Johan Christian Fabricius in 1775. It is found in large parts of the world, including China, Hawaii, São Tomé and Príncipe, the Society Islands, Thailand, New Zealand, and Australia (New South Wales, Norfolk Island, Northern Territory, Queensland and Western Australia). Subspecies Anomis flava fimbriago is found in North America.

The wingspan is about 28 mm.

The larvae feed on Hibiscus rosa-sinensis, Hibiscus cannabinus and Legnephora moorei and Gossypium hirsutum.

Subspecies
Anomis flava flava
Anomis flava fimbriago (Stephens, 1829)

Gallery

References

External links

Catocalinae
Moths of Asia
Moths of Oceania
Moths of Africa
Moths of North America
Moths of New Zealand
Moths described in 1775
Taxa named by Johan Christian Fabricius